= Albanian Horticultural and Potato Institute =

The Albanian Horticultural and Potato Institute (Albanian: Instituti i Perimeve dhe Patates) was a scientific research institute, created in 1980 and discontinued in 2006.

== History ==
The Horticultural and Potato Institute was created in 1980 in Tirana, Albania, as a continuation of a former station of research on horticulture and potato that had been created in 1972. Its goal was the research on horticultural crops and new hybrids, the creation of variety structures, seed selection, and scientific cultivation. The institute's research was key in the 1980s when many horticultural bio products of Albania were successfully exported into Western and Eastern Europe.

In 2006 the institute was dissolved by law (government decree Nr. 515, as of 19 July 2006) as a nation-wide reorganization occurred, following which new scientific institutions (called Transfer Centers of Agricultural Technology (Albanian: Qendra e Transferimit të Teknologjive Bujqësore)) were created.
